The 2017–18 Ethiopian Premier League is the 71st season of top-tier football in Ethiopia (20th season as the Premier League). The season began play on 4 November 2017 and ended on 16 July 2018.

League table

See also
2018 Ethiopian Cup

References

Premier League
Premier League
Ethiopian Premier League
Ethiopian Premier League